Werner Wittig (23 May 1909 – 4 February 1992) was a German cyclist. He competed in the individual and team road race events at the 1932 Summer Olympics.

References

External links
 

1909 births
1992 deaths
German male cyclists
Olympic cyclists of Germany
Cyclists at the 1932 Summer Olympics
Place of birth missing
German emigrants to the United States
Cyclists from Berlin
20th-century German people